Denied is that which has been given a denial.

Denied may also refer to:

Film and television
Denied, a 2004 film starring Matt Austin
"Denied", a 2016 episode of The Story of Us

Songs
"Denied", from the 1994 Our Lady Peace album Naveed
"Denied", from the 1996 Unwritten Law album Oz Factor
"Denied", from the 1997 Edith Frost album Calling Over Time
"Denied", from the 1997 Gang Green album Another Case of Brewtality
"Denied", from the 2001 Annihilator album Carnival Diablos
"Denied", from the 2004 Jackdaw album Triple Crown
"Denied", from the 2005 Obituary album Frozen in Time
"Denied", from the 2006 Robert Pollard album From a Compound Eye
"Denied", from the 2007 Sonic Syndicate album Only Inhuman
"Denied", from the 2010 Fiction Plan album Sparks
"Denied", from the 2012 Arsis album Lepers Caress
"Denied", from the 2012 Zebra & Giraffe album The Wisest Ones
"Denied", from the 2013 Factor album Woke Up Alone

See also

 Denial (disambiguation)
 Deny (disambiguation)
 Refusal (disambiguation)